Uris may refer to:

People
Harold Uris (1905–1982), American real estate investor, brother of Percy
Leon Uris (1924–2003), American novelist
Percy Uris (1899–1971), American real estate investor, brother of Harold
Stanley Uris Character from Stephen King's "It"

Places
Uris Theatre in New York City, now called the George Gershwin Theatre
Uris Library, on the Cornell University campus
Uris Hall, on the Cornell University campus

Other
Uris Buildings Corporation, founded by Harold and Percy Uris

See also
Uri (disambiguation)